A chemical bonding model is a theoretical model used to explain atomic bonding structure, molecular geometry, properties, and reactivity of physical matter. This can refer to:
 VSEPR theory, a model of molecular geometry.
 Valence bond theory, which describes molecular electronic structure with localized bonds and lone pairs.
 Molecular orbital theory, which describes molecular electronic structure with delocalized molecular orbitals.
 Crystal field theory, an electrostatic model for transition metal complexes.
 Ligand field theory, the application of molecular orbital theory to transition metal complexes.

Chemical bonding